= Dcct =

The abbreviation DCCT can stand for:

- Diabetes control and complications trial
- Zero-flux Direct Current-Current Transformer or DC Current Transformer, a current-to-voltage transducer, employed when measurement of very high current (up to several dozen of kA) is required.
- Dismounted Close Combat Trainer. A system using a computer simulated firing range used by the British Armed forces for training in weapon handing without the risk of handling a live weapon
